Leonida Frascarelli (21 February 1906 – 18 June 1991) was an Italian racing cyclist. He won stages 2 and 14 of the 1930 Giro d'Italia.

References

External links
 

1906 births
1991 deaths
Italian male cyclists
Italian Giro d'Italia stage winners
Cyclists from Rome
20th-century Italian people